Fräulein is the German language honorific previously in common use for unmarried women, comparable to Miss in English.

Fräulein may also refer to:

"Fraulein" (song), a 1957 song
Fräulein (1958 film), a World War II film starring Dana Wynter and Mel Ferrer
Das Fräulein, a 2006 film

See also